Bor is a rural locality (a village) in Kharovskoye Rural Settlement, Kharovsky District, Vologda Oblast, Russia. The population was 8 as of 2002.

Geography 
Bor is located 12 km northeast of Kharovsk (the district's administrative centre) by road. Kosarikha is the nearest rural locality.

References 

Rural localities in Kharovsky District